MacGinitie is a surname. Notable people with the surname include:

 George MacGinitie (1889–1989), American marine biologist
 Harry Dunlap MacGinitie (1896–1987), American paleobotanist
 Laura MacGinitie, American rower
 Nettie MacGinitie (1899–1993), American marine biologist